Pattersonocnus is an extinct genus of megalonychid sloth that lived during the Miocene in Venezuela 11.6 million years ago. The genus contains one known species, Pattersonocnus diazgameroi. Fossils have been found in the Urumaco Formation of Venezuela.

References

Prehistoric sloths
Miocene xenarthrans
Miocene mammals of South America
Neogene Venezuela
Fossils of Venezuela
Huayquerian
Chasicoan
Mayoan
Fossil taxa described in 2019
Prehistoric placental genera